Robert James Saner-Haigh (called Rob; born 1973) is a British Anglican bishop. He has been the Bishop of Penrith — the sole suffragan bishop of the Diocese of Carlisle — since 2022; he was previously a residentiary canon of Newcastle Cathedral and Director of Mission and Ministry for the Diocese of Newcastle since 2020.

Early life and education
He was educated at Birmingham University, graduating with a BA in Ancient History and Archaeology in 1994 and an MPhil in Archaeology in 1998, followed by training for ministry at Wycliffe Hall, Oxford, receiving a BA in 2004, upgraded to an MA in 2008.

Ordained ministry
He was ordained deacon in 2005, and priest in 2006. He was curate of Appleby-in-Westmorland in the Diocese of Carlisle from 2005 to 2007, then from 2007 to 2010 held the joint post of bishop's domestic chaplain, and curate of Dalston with Cumdivock, in the same diocese. From 2008 to 2010, he was also director of ordinands for the diocese.

In 2010, he was appointed priest in charge of Kendal Parish Church, and held that position until 2020 when he became a residentiary canon of Newcastle Cathedral and Director of Mission and Ministry for the Diocese of Newcastle.

On 27 May 2022, it was announced that he was to become Bishop of Penrith in the Diocese of Carlisle; he was consecrated into episcopal orders by Stephen Cottrell, Archbishop of York, on 15 July 2022 in York Minster.

Views
He holds a "traditional view of Holy Matrimony" (i.e. one man and one woman).

References

Living people
21st-century English Anglican priests
1973 births
Alumni of the University of Birmingham
Alumni of Wycliffe Hall, Oxford